Kahvalhah Dhaandhen is a 2002 Maldivian drama film directed by Amjad Ibrahim. Produced by Hassan Ali under Dash Studio, the film stars Yoosuf Shafeeu and Sheela Najeeb in pivotal roles.

Cast 
 Yoosuf Shafeeu as Viyaam
 Sheela Najeeb as Yashmee
 Kausar as Sudha
 Mohamed Shavin as Zahid
 Ahmed Shah as Areesh
 Neena Saleem as Nujey
 Mariyam Haleem

Soundtrack

References

2002 films
2002 drama films
Maldivian drama films
Films directed by Amjad Ibrahim
Dhivehi-language films